Toscanelli is a tiny, bowl-shaped lunar impact crater that is located to the north of the prominent crater Aristarchus, in the northwestern part of the Moon. The crater lies at the southern end of a rille that proceeds towards the north. This rille is part of a nearby system that has the designation Rimae Aristarchus. Just to the south of Toscanelli is a fault line in the surface named the Rupes Toscanelli, after the crater. This break in the surface continues to the south for a distance of about 70 kilometers.

References

 
 
 
 
 
 
 
 
 
 
 
 

Impact craters on the Moon